The August Sehrt House is a historic home located at Augusta, St. Charles County, Missouri. It was built about 1860 by German immigrant, August Sehrt. He came to America in 1848 with several family members, including his brother, Julius Sehrt who went on to become the most extensive land owner in St. Charles, MO.  It is a -story, five bay, brick dwelling on a stone foundation and with a side-gable roof. The building houses the Augusta History Museum.

The August Sehrt House was added to the National Register of Historic Places in 1994.

References

Museums in St. Charles County, Missouri
Houses on the National Register of Historic Places in Missouri
Houses completed in 1860
Buildings and structures in St. Charles County, Missouri
National Register of Historic Places in St. Charles County, Missouri